Traunsteinera, the round headed orchid, or globe orchid, is a genus of flowering plants from the orchid family, Orchidaceae.

Description
Traunsteinera species are terrestrial, perennial plants (geophytes), which overwinter with two ovate root nodules.

They are slender, up to 60 cm high plants. The flower stem has no leaf rosette but scattered stem leaves.

The inflorescence is very dense, with dozens of small flowers in an initially cone-shaped, later spherical to spherical spike. The perianth petals are oval in shape, with a long spatulate spire, forming a helmet. The lip is three-lobed, with a thin, curved spur. The gynostemium is short and obtuse, the rostellum three-lobed.

Distribution
The species is rare and occurs locally in the medium and high mountain ranges from the temperate regions of Europe to the Caucasus. Plants are found growing in neutral to calcareous, moist or dry soils in sunny places such as calcareous grasslands and alpine meadows. In medium and high mountain ranges from 1000-3000 m.

Taxonomy
Traunsteinera is named after the Austrian pharmacist and botanist Joseph Traunsteiner (1798–1850). The scientific name was published in 1842 by Heinrich Gottlieb Ludwig Reichenbach.

Species
There are two known species, native to Europe, Turkey and the Caucasus.

See also
 List of Orchidaceae genera

References

External links

Fancy Plants, Globe Orchid (Traunsteinera)
Czech Botany, Traunsteinera globosa, hlavinka horská, pavstavač hlavatý
Blumen in Schwaben, Kugelorchis (Traunsteinera)
Numericable, Traunsteinera globosa, Orchis globuleux, Globe-flowered orchis, Rote Kugelorchis, Rosa Kugel-Knabenkraut
Stéphane Aubry photos,  Traunsteinera globosa
AHO Bayern, Kugelknabenkraut, Rosa Kugelorchis, Traunsteinera globosa 
Tela Botania, Orchis globuleux, Traunsteinera globosa
Terra Alapítvány, Traunsteinera globosa, Gömböskosbor
Plantarium, Traunsteinera globosa, Описание таксона

Orchideae genera
Orchideae
Taxa named by Ludwig Reichenbach